Lopata is a settlement in Celje, eastern Slovenia. Lopata may also refer to:

 Lopata, Žužemberk, Slovenia
 Łopata, Świętokrzyskie Voivodeship, Poland
 Łopata Polska, Poland
 Lopata (surname)
 Lopata, islet (sea stack) with the Lopata lighthouse, located of the shore of Klek peninsula, Neum, Bosnia and Herzegovina

See also